Vladimir Timofeevich Belyakov (2 January 1918, Dmitrov – 21 May 1996, Moscow) was a Soviet gymnast.

Belyakov worked at the Central State Institute of Physical Culture in Moscow (1951), competed for Dynamo Moscow. Associated professor of Lomonosov Moscow State University (Chair of physical education). Author of the books "Sportsmanship of soviet gymnasts" and "Essays about soviet gymnasts".

Achievements
 Title Meritorious master of sport of USSR (1947)
 Title Meritorious coach of RSFSR (1960)
 International-level judge (1962)
 1946 USSR champion in Vault
 1940, 1947 USSR champion in Parallel bars
 1939, 1940, 1943–1945, 1947 USSR champion in Floor exercise
 1944, 1947 USSR All-around champion
 1952 Olympic champion (team)

External links
 

1918 births
1996 deaths
People from Dmitrovsky District, Moscow Oblast
People from Dmitrovsky Uyezd (Moscow Governorate)
Russian male artistic gymnasts
Soviet male artistic gymnasts
Olympic gymnasts of the Soviet Union
Olympic gold medalists for the Soviet Union
Sportspeople from Moscow Oblast
Olympic medalists in gymnastics
Gymnasts at the 1952 Summer Olympics
Medalists at the 1952 Summer Olympics